Mohamed Hashish (born May 22, 1947) is an Egyptian-born research scientist best known as the father of the abrasive water jet cutter.

Youth and schooling 

Mohamed Hashish was born in Alexandria, Egypt to Ahmed Hashish and Zeinab Amin. Mohamed Hashish completed his elementary and high school education in Kafr El Dawwar.  He subsequently attended the Faculty of Engineering, Alexandria University where he obtained a B.Sc. in mechanical engineering with honors.  After serving as a teaching assistant for three years in the same department, 25-year-old Mohamed Hashish accepted a scholarship offer from Concordia University in Montreal, Quebec, Canada. There, Mohamed earned his PhD in mechanical engineering.  His thesis was on the theory of waterjet cutting.

Flow International 
Hashish joined Flow Research Inc., now Flow International Corporation in Kent, Washington, U.S., as a research scientist, in early 1979.  Although Flow was involved in waterjet cutting, mainly for mining and limited factory applications, it wasn't until Hashish invented a new technique to add abrasives to the waterjet that the strongest cutting tool in the world was realized. This new technology revolutionized the waterjet technology and spread its use in over 50 industries worldwide. Hashish supplemented his initial invention with over 40 patents  to date to further improve and enhance the performance of waterjet cutting systems.  
Due to his outstanding work in the field and consistent advancements to the abrasive waterjet technology, the University of Washington department of Mechanical Engineering honored him with the appointment as an affiliate professor of Mechanical Engineering. Hashish is also honored with the first technology award from the Water Jet Technology Association (WJTA), the pioneer award, and the service award from the same association.

Personal life 
Mohamed was married in 1979 to Nadia Afifi, Doctor of Dental Surgery.  Mohamed and Nadia have two children, Ameer and Rami Hashish. In his spare time, Hashish enjoys landscape architecture, skiing, fishing and travelling.

References

20th-century Egyptian engineers
21st-century Egyptian engineers
1947 births
Alexandria University alumni
Concordia University alumni
Egyptian emigrants to the United States
Egyptian mechanical engineers
Faculty of Engineering, Alexandria University alumni
Living people
University of Washington faculty